Sultan bin Khalifa Al Nahyan (born 1965) is an Emirati military officer, businessman and son of the former President of the United Arab Emirates Sheikh Khalifa bin Zayed Al Nahyan.

Early life and education
Sultan was born in Al Ain in 1965. He is the eldest son of Khalifa bin Zayed, former ruler of Abu Dhabi and former president of the United Arab Emirates.

He holds a bachelor's degree in political and administrative sciences, which he received from Emirates University. He also graduated from Zayed bin Sultan Military College in Al Ain in March 1988. Then he attended the Royal Military Academy Sandhurst and graduated in 1989. He received a master's degree in political science from the University of Salford in July 1989. Additionally, he holds two PhDs: one in international studies from the University of Limerick in November 1998 and the other from Nasser Military Academy in the Arab Republic of Egypt in April 1999.

Career
Sultan was promoted to the rank of lieutenant colonel staff pilot in 1999 and then to the rank of colonel staff in February, 2000. He was the advisor to the president of the UAE, Khalifa bin Zayed, and the board chairman of the SBK Holding. In addition, he is a member of the UAE's equestrian federation. He was among the board members of the Executive Council of Abu Dhabi until December 2010.

Business activities
His firm provides mediation between businesspeople, for instance, between Roman Abramovich and Boris Berezovsky in 2001.

Personal life
Sheikh Sultan married Sheikha bint Saif Al Nahyan in 1984. They have six children together:

Al Yazia bint Sultan bin Khalifa Al Nahyan 
Hissa bint Sultan bin Khalifa Al Nahyan 
Zayed bin Sultan bin Khalifa Al Nahyan
Shamma bint Sultan bin Khalifa Al Nahyan
Mohammed bin Sultan bin Khalifa Al Nahyan 
Khalifa bin Sultan bin Khalifa Al Nahyan

One of Sultan bin Khalifa's children is Sheikha Shamma, who is the CEO of Alliances for Global Sustainability, founder of the Circle of Hope foundation and co-founder of Abu Dhabi-based social enterprise Aurora50, which is working to achieve gender balance in the workplace.

Ancestry

References

1965 births
Alumni of the University of Salford
Alumni of the University of Limerick
Children of presidents of the United Arab Emirates
Emirati military officers
Emirati corporate directors
Sultan
Graduates of the Royal Military Academy Sandhurst
Living people
People from Al Ain
United Arab Emirates University alumni
Sons of monarchs